Dejvi Bilali (born 15 June 1996) is an Albanian professional footballer who plays as a midfielder for Albanian club KF Besa Kavajë.

References

External links
 
 Profile - FSHF

1996 births
Living people
Footballers from Elbasan
Albanian footballers
Association football midfielders
Albania youth international footballers
KS Turbina Cërrik players
KF Elbasani players
KF Teuta Durrës players
KF Vllaznia Shkodër players
KS Egnatia Rrogozhinë players
FK Dinamo Tirana players
KF Besa Kavajë players
Kategoria e Parë players
Kategoria Superiore players